Patrick James Hand (14 October 1923 – 2 July 1994) was an Australian rules footballer who played with Footscray in the Victorian Football League (VFL).

Notes

External links 

1923 births
1994 deaths
Australian rules footballers from Victoria (Australia)
Western Bulldogs players